Typhlacontias rudebecki, Rudebeck's western burrowing skink, is a species of lizard which is endemic to Angola.

References

rudebecki
Reptiles of Angola
Reptiles described in 1997
Taxa named by Wulf Dietrich Haacke